Greetings from Less Than Jake is an EP by American ska-punk band Less Than Jake, released on 20 June 2011 on Sleep It Off. Described as the band's "287th release," the EP was released to coincide with their appearance on the Warped Tour 2011, and was subsequently followed by Seasons Greetings from Less Than Jake, in February 2012. In October 2012, the two EPs were combined to create the full-length album, Greetings and Salutations (2012).

Background and recording
Greetings from Less Than Jake was recorded at bassist and vocalist Roger Manganelli's home studio, The Moathouse, with Manganelli producing under the pseudonym, Roger Lima. Regarding the EP's recording sessions, trombonist Buddy Schaub noted, "Working on this record was a nice breath of fresh air for our band in that no one else was involved at all this time around. It’s been a long time since we’ve done a record with no outside involvement at all such as a producer or label schmooks tossing in their opinions here and there. We recorded everything at Roger’s studio, and got done with everything: writing, recording, mixing, and mastering in only a couple of months."

Discussing the notion of there being unreleased tracks from the recording sessions, saxophonist and backing vocalist Peter "JR" Wasilewski noted, "There were songs, but they weren’t full, thought-out ideas. They were chord progressions and things. Writing is constant with us, so they might be used in our next release." It is unknown if any of these song ideas appear on the EP's follow-up, Seasons Greetings from Less Than Jake.

Release
The EP was released on June 20, 2011 and had previously been unannounced. Regarding the decision to record an EP, as opposed to a full-length album, saxophonist and backing vocalist Peter "JR" Wasilewski noted, "I think releasing full records these days is kind of retarded. We just come up with different ways to release a record. I’m not trying to call people out, but there are a lot of things in modern music right now that are totally bumming me out. [...] As far as releasing songs, as you get older people care less and less about what you do now. It’s more about what you’ve already done, and we’ve realized that. The term legacy act applies to our band when you refer to Less Than Jake. We do work really hard on our new songs though compared to our contemporaries, and we’re one of the few of them that do that. It’s not going be the best of the best, but it’s pretty good. Kids get it for free anyway. We’re trying to find new ways to put things out." Similarly, trombonist Buddy Schaub stated, "These days an EP is plenty for people to digest. It trims the fat so to speak. Putting out five quality songs is better than ten mediocre songs. And with our schedules and Roger’s studio, going in to bust out five songs at a time keeps the frequency of music into the fan’s hands at a peak."

Track listing
All songs written by Less Than Jake.
"Can't Yell Any Louder" - 1:41  
"Goodbye, Mr. Personality" - 3:30
"Harvey Wallbanger" - 3:06
"Oldest Trick in the Book" - 3:10
"Life Lived Out Loud" - 2:40

Personnel

Less Than Jake
Chris Demakes - vocals, guitar
Roger Manganelli - vocals, bass guitar
Peter "JR" Wasilewski - saxophone, vocals
Buddy Schaub - trombone
Vinnie Fiorello - drums

Recording personnel
Roger Lima - producer, recording
Stephen Egerton - mixing, mastering

Artwork
JP Flexner

References

Less Than Jake albums
2011 EPs